
Tarnowskie Góry County is a unit of territorial administration and local government (powiat) in Silesian Voivodeship, southern Poland. It came into being on January 1, 1999, as a result of the Polish local government reforms passed in 1998.

As of 2019 its total population is 140,022, out of which the population of Tarnowskie Góry is 61,422, that of Radzionków is 16,826, that of Kalety is 8,607, that of Miasteczko Śląskie is 7,437, and the rural population is 45,730.

Neighbouring counties
Tarnowskie Góry County is bordered by Lubliniec County to the north, Myszków County to the east, Będzin County and the city of Piekary Śląskie to the south-east, the cities of Bytom and Zabrze to the south, the city of Gliwice and Gliwice County to the south-west, and Strzelce County to the west.

Administrative division

The county is subdivided into nine gminas (four urban and five rural). These are listed in the following table, in descending order of population.

References

 
Land counties of Silesian Voivodeship